Easy Sex, Sad Movies ( as released in Argentina or  in Spain) is a 2014 Argentine-Spanish comedy film directed by . It stars Ernesto Alterio, Quim Gutiérrez, Marta Etura, Julieta Cardinali, Carlos Areces and Bárbara Santa-Cruz.

Cast

Release 
The film was theatrically released in Argentina on 16 October 2014. Distributed by Filmax, it was theatrically released in Spain on 24 April 2015.

See also 
 List of Argentine films of 2014
 List of Spanish films of 2015

References

External links 

2014 comedy films
Argentine romantic comedy films
Spanish romantic comedy films
2010s Spanish-language films
2010s Spanish films
2010s Argentine films